Brandon Stephan Paul (born April 30, 1991) is an American professional basketball player for Ratiopharm Ulm of the German Basketball Bundesliga (BBL), and the EuroCup. During his senior year at Warren Township High School, Paul was named Illinois Mr. Basketball for 2009. Paul played college basketball for the University of Illinois and became only the second player in program history to record 1,500 points, 500 rebounds, 300 assists and 100 steals.

High school career
Paul played for Warren Township High School. In high school, Paul was named a member of the 2009 Illinois All-American Team as selected by the Associated Press, Chicago Tribune, Chicago Sun-Times, News-Gazette, and the Illinois Basketball Coaches Association. After his senior season Paul was named Illinois Mr. Basketball for 2009, narrowly edging out his future University of Illinois teammate Jereme Richmond.

College career
Entering the University of Illinois during the 2009–10 season, Paul quickly became a key contributor, as he averaged 7.8 points and 3.1 rebounds per game in 18.9 minutes per game. As a sophomore, Paul played in all 34 games for the 2010–11 Illinois Fighting Illini men's basketball team. He averaged 22.4 minutes of playing time and continued as a key contributor.  He averaged 9.0 points per game and reached double-figures in 13 games.  Paul led his team in steals, averaging 1.1 per game, and was second in assists, averaging 2.1 per game. On February 13, 2011, Brandon scored a season-high 23 points in a 71–80 Illini loss to Purdue.

In his junior year, Paul earned the role of a full-time starter for the 2011–12 season. On January 10, 2012, Paul scored 43 points in an upset win over then ranked #3 Ohio State. It was the third highest scoring total in a single game by an Illinois men's basketball player while his eight three-pointers tied the school record.

As a senior, Paul led Illinois to win the Maui Invitational Tournament title in 2012 with a win over Butler in the championship game. Paul was named Most Valuable Player (MVP) of the tournament. During his senior season, Paul averaged 16.6 points a game over the course of 36 games. On March 14, 2013, Paul hit a game winning shot against Minnesota in the 2013 Big Ten Conference men's basketball tournament. After graduating, Paul became just the second Illini player to reach career milestones of 1,500 points, 500 rebounds, 300 assists and 100 steals and finished his college career as the eighth-leading scorer in school history with 1,654 points.

Professional career

Nizhny Novgorod (2013–14)
After going undrafted in the 2013 NBA draft, Paul joined the Minnesota Timberwolves for the 2013 NBA Summer League. On August 10, 2013, Paul signed with Nizhny Novgorod of Russia for the 2013–14 season. In early February 2014, he left Russia after experiencing racism and a difficult language barrier. Paul returned to the United States after playing in 12 games and averaging 6.4 points, 2.7 rebounds and 0.5 steals in 13.8 minutes per game.

Canton Charge (2014–15)
On February 27, 2014, he was acquired by the Canton Charge of the NBA Development League. On March 14, 2014, he was waived by the Charge due to a season-ending injury.

On November 2, 2014, Paul was reacquired by the Canton Charge. On April 4, 2015, he was placed on the inactive list for the remainder of the season due to injury, and was waived two days later.

Joventut Badalona (2015–16)
On September 14, 2015, Paul signed with Spanish club FIATC Joventut. He started 25 of 33 games and led the team in scoring with 13 points per game.

Anadolu Efes (2016–17)
After playing for the Charlotte Hornets and the Philadelphia 76ers during the 2016 NBA Summer League, Paul signed with the 76ers on July 25, 2016, but was waived on October 24 after appearing in four preseason games. On December 13, 2016, he signed with Turkish club Anadolu Efes for the rest of the 2016–17 season.

San Antonio Spurs (2017–2018)
In July 2017, Paul joined the Dallas Mavericks in Orlando and the Cleveland Cavaliers in Las Vegas for the 2017 NBA Summer League. During summer league play, Paul averaged 15.6 points, 5.3 rebounds, 2.7 assists, and 1.7 steals per game on 47.12% shooting from the field. On July 14, 2017, he signed with the San Antonio Spurs. Paul had his debut in NBA on October 18, 2017, coming off the bench in a 107–99 win over the Minnesota Timberwolves. On October 30, 2017, Paul scored team-high 18 points with five rebounds, in a 94–108 loss to the Boston Celtics. On April 19, 2018, Paul made his debut in NBA playoffs, coming off from bench with an assist and a rebound in a 97-110 loss to the Golden State Warriors. On July 31, 2018, the Spurs waived Paul.

Zhejiang Golden Bulls (2019)
Paul signed with the Zhejiang Golden Bulls of the Chinese Basketball Association (CBA) on December 28, 2018. Paul made his CBA debut on January 4, scoring 40 points with eight rebounds, five assists and three steals in a 104–93 win over the Jilin Northeast Tigers. Five days later on January 9, Paul made his first triple-double in CBA, scoring 51 points with 17 rebounds, 11 assists and four steals in a 111–105 win over the Fujian Sturgeons.

Olympiacos (2019–20)
On July 6, 2019, Paul signed a two-year deal with the Greek EuroLeague club Olympiacos, Paul was released by Olympiacos on June 30, 2020.

Adelaide 36ers (2021)
On February 18, 2021, Paul signed with the Adelaide 36ers of the Australian National Basketball League for the remainder of the 2020–21 NBL season. He made his debut for the 36ers with a 25-point performance against the Perth Wildcats on March 14, 2021.

Joventut Badalona (2021)
On July 10, 2021, Paul signed with the Club Joventut Badalona of the Spanish Liga ACB a one-year deal.

ratiopharm Ulm (2022–present)
On December 8, 2022, he signed with ratiopharm Ulm of the German Basketball Bundesliga (BBL).

Player profile
Paul is known as a quick, athletic guard who is able to defend against point guards, shooting guards, and small forwards.

Personal life
Paul is the son of Cliff Sr. and Lynda Paul. His mother Lynda played college basketball for Ball State University and coached Paul's Amateur Athletic Union (AAU) basketball team, the Illinois Hoopstars Paul's father, Cliff Sr., is police officer and a United States Navy veteran who served 13 years in the service. After the September 11 attacks in 2001, Cliff Sr. was stationed in Spain for six months. He has two brothers, Cliff Jr. and Darius Paul. Darius played one season for Western Michigan before transferring to Illinois for the 2013–14 season as a redshirt sophomore.

Career statistics

College

|-
| style="text-align:left;"| 2009–10
| style="text-align:left;"| Illinois
| 36 || 15 || 18.9 || .333 || .279 || .644 || 3.1 || 1.3 || .8 || .1 || 7.8
|-
| style="text-align:left;"| 2010–11
| style="text-align:left;"| Illinois
| 34 || 10 || 22.4 || .399 || .361 || .767 || 3.1 || 2.1 || 1.1 || .4 || 9.0
|-
| style="text-align:left;"| 2011–12
| style="text-align:left;"| Illinois
| 32 || 30 || 33.4 || .392 || .333 || .727 || 4.7 || 2.9 || 1.4 || .8 || 14.7
|-
| style="text-align:left;"| 2012–13
| style="text-align:left;"| Illinois
| 36 || 35 || 32.0 || .401 || .325 || .738 || 4.4 || 2.7 || 1.2 || .6 || 16.6
|-

EuroLeague

|-
| style="text-align:left;"| 2016–17
| style="text-align:left;"| Anadolu Efes
| 23 || 14 || 17.2 || .340 || .415 || .703 || 1.0 || .6 || 1.0 || .3 || 8.6 || 5.8

NBA

Regular season

|-
| style="text-align:left;"| 
| style="text-align:left;"| San Antonio
| 64 || 2 || 9.0 || .433 || .278 || .512 || 1.1 || .6 || .4 || .1 || 2.3
|- class="sortbottom"
| style="text-align:center;" colspan="2"| Career
| 64 || 2 || 9.0 || .433 || .278 || .512 || 1.1 || .6 || .4 || .1 || 2.3

Playoffs

|-
| style="text-align:left;"| 2018
| style="text-align:left;"| San Antonio
| 1 || 0 || 3.0 || .0 || .0 || .0 || 1.0 || 1.0 || .0 || .0 || 0.0
|- class="sortbottom"
| style="text-align:center;" colspan="2"| Career
| 1 || 0 || 3.0 || .0 || .0 || .0 || 1.0 || 1.0 || .0 || .0 || 0.0

References

External links
 
 NBA G League Profile
 RealGM Profile
 Brandon Paul at acb.com 
 Brandon Paul at euroleague.net
 Proballers.com Profile
 TBLStat.net Profile
 

1991 births
Living people
Adelaide 36ers players
American expatriate basketball people in Australia
American expatriate basketball people in China
American expatriate basketball people in Russia
American expatriate basketball people in Spain
American expatriate basketball people in Turkey
American men's basketball players
Anadolu Efes S.K. players
Austin Spurs players
Basketball players from Illinois
BC Nizhny Novgorod players
Canton Charge players
Illinois Fighting Illini men's basketball players
Joventut Badalona players
Liga ACB players
Olympiacos B.C. players
People from Gurnee, Illinois
San Antonio Spurs players
Shooting guards
Small forwards
Sportspeople from the Chicago metropolitan area
Undrafted National Basketball Association players
Zhejiang Golden Bulls players